Steven van Heerden (born 6 August 1993) is a South African racing cyclist, who currently rides for South African amateur team Enza.

Major results

2015
 African Track Championships
1st  Team pursuit
1st  Madison
 1st  Team pursuit, National Track Championships (with Jac-Johann Steyn, Jared Poulton and Jean Spies)
2016
 1st  Individual pursuit, National Track Championships
2017
 African Track Championships
1st  Team pursuit (with Nolan Hoffman, Jean Spies and Joshua van Wyk)
1st  Individual pursuit
1st  Points race
1st  Madison (with Nolan Hoffman)
 1st  Points race, National Track Championships
2018
 African Track Championships
1st  Team pursuit (with Gert Fouche, Jean Spies and Joshua van Wyk)
1st  Points race
2nd Scratch
3rd Individual pursuit
 1st Stage 4 Tour de Limpopo
2019
 African Track Championships
1st  Madison (with Joshua van Wyk)
2nd Omnium

References

External links
 
 
 

1993 births
Living people
South African track cyclists
South African male cyclists